The 2011 Valencia Open 500 was a men's tennis tournament played on indoor hard courts. It was the 17th edition of the Open de Tenis Comunidad Valenciana, and was part of the 500 Series of the 2011 ATP World Tour. It was held at the Ciutat de les Arts i les Ciències in Valencia, Spain, from 31 October through 6 November 2011. Unseeded Marcel Granollers won the singles title.

Players

Seeds

 Seeds are based on the rankings of October 24, 2011.

Other entrants
The following players received wildcards into the singles main draw:
  Daniel Gimeno-Traver
  Javier Martí
  Juan Mónaco

The following players received entry from the qualifying draw:

  Martin Kližan
  Igor Kunitsyn 
  Nicolas Mahut
  Vasek Pospisil

Finals

Singles

 Marcel Granollers defeated  Juan Mónaco, 6–2, 4–6, 7–6(7–3)
It was Granollers' 2nd title of the year and 3rd of his career.

Doubles

 Bob Bryan /  Mike Bryan defeated  Eric Butorac /  Jean-Julien Rojer, 6–4, 7–6(11–9)

References

External links
Official website

 
Val
Valencia Open
Val
Valencia Open
Valencia Open